Joseph Carlisle McAlhany (June 8, 1915 – July 1, 2005) was an American politician. He served as a member of the South Carolina House of Representatives.

Life and career 
McAlhany attended St. George High School.

In 1961, McAlhany was elected to the South Carolina House of Representatives, representing Dorchester County, South Carolina, serving until 1968. In 1971, he was re-elected.

McAlhany died in July 2005, at the age of 90.

References 

1915 births
2005 deaths
Members of the South Carolina House of Representatives
20th-century American politicians